A pergola is a type of garden feature. It can also refer to a structure that resembles a garden pergola as, for example, the "pergola" in Seattle's Pioneer Square.

Pergola may also refer to:

Places in Italy
 Pergola, Marche, a town and comune in the Province of Pesaro e Urbino
Diocese of Cagli e Pergola, diocese in Italy 1819–1986
Roman Catholic Diocese of Fano-Fossombrone-Cagli-Pergola, diocese in Italy from 1986
Teatro della Pergola, opera house in Florence

People
Antonio Mario La Pergola (1931–2007), Italian judge
Paolo da Pergola (d. 1455), Italian humanist philosopher
Vinnie Pergola (born 1989), American TV actor

Viticulture
Pergola (vine system)

Other
Pergola (album), 2001 album by the band Johan
Gilt Bronzes from Cartoceto di Pergola, Roman statues found in Cartoceto, a frazione of the comune of Pergola